The 1928–29 NCAA men's basketball season began in December 1928, progressed through the regular season and conference tournaments, and concluded in March 1929.

Rule changes
The charging foul by the player dribbling the ball was introduced.

Season headlines 

 The Big Six Conference and Missouri Valley Conference began play. Both had formed when the Missouri Valley Intercollegiate Athletic Association (MVIAA) split into the two new conferences in May 1928, with the Big Six Conference officially retaining the MVIAA's name and the Missouri Valley Conference retaining its staff. Both claimed the MVIAA's founding date (1907) and its history from 1907 to 1928 as their own, and both claimed to be a continuation of the original conference.
 The practice of naming an annual Consensus All-American Team began.
 In February 1943, the Helms Athletic Foundation retroactively selected Montana State as its national champion for the 1928–29 season.
 In 1995, the Premo-Porretta Power Poll retroactively selected Montana State as its national champion for the 1928–29 season.

Conference membership changes

Regular season

Conference winners and tournaments

Statistical leaders

Awards

Consensus All-American team

Major player of the year awards 

 Helms Player of the Year: John "Cat" Thompson,  (retroactive selection in 1944)

Coaching changes 

A number of teams changed coaches during the season and after it ended.

References